Mangyan is the generic name for the eight indigenous groups found on the island of Mindoro, southwest of the island of Luzon, the Philippines, each with its own tribal name, language, and customs. The total population may be around 280,001, but official statistics are difficult to determine under the conditions of remote areas, reclusive tribal groups and some having little if any outside world contact.

The ethnic groups of the island, from north to south, are: Iraya, Alangan, Tadyawan, Tawbuid (called Batangan by lowlanders on the west of the island), Buhid, and Hanunoo. An additional group on the south coast is labelled Ratagnon. They appear to be intermarried with lowlanders. The group known on the east of Mindoro as Bangon may be a subgroup of Tawbuid, as they speak the 'western' dialect of that language. They also have a kind of poetry which is called the Ambahan.

Origins

The Mangyans were once the only inhabitants of Mindoro. Being coastal dwellers at first, they have moved inland and into the mountains to avoid the influx and influence of foreign settlers such as the Tagalogs, the Spanish and their conquests and religious conversion, and raids by the Moro (they raided Spanish settlements for economic purposes, and to satisfy the demand for slave labor). Today, the Mangyans live secludedly in remote parts of Mindoro but eventually comes down to the lowlands in order to make usual trades. Their sustenance are farming for their own crops, fruits, and hunting. A certain group of Mangyans living in Southern Mindoro call themselves Hanunuo Mangyans, meaning "true", "pure" or "genuine", a term that they use to stress the fact that they are strict in the sense of ancestral preservation of tradition and practices.

Before the Spaniards arrived in Mindoro, the people traded with the Chinese extensively, with thousands of supporting archaeological evidences found in Puerto Galera and in written Chinese references. A division was created among the people of Mindoro when the Spaniards came. There were the Iraya Mangyans, who isolated themselves from the culture of the Spaniards, and the lowland Christians who submitted themselves to a new belief system. These two groups only interacted for economic matters through trading forest goods from the Mangyan and consumer goods for the lowlanders.

Despite being grouped as one tribe, Mangyans differ in many ways. In comparison to the technological advance between the two geographical divisions, the Southern tribes are more advanced as seen in their use of weaving, pottery and system of writing. The Northern tribes, on the other hand, are simpler in their way of living. Their language, as in the rest of the Philippines, came from the Austronesian language family. However, even if they are defined as one ethnic group, the tribes used different languages. On the average, they only share 40% of their vocabulary.

Another difference between tribes is the date of their arrival in the Philippines. A theory suggests that the Southern tribes were already present by 900 AD while the Northern tribes are believed to have arrived hundreds of years ahead of their Southern peers. The Spanish authorities had documented their existence since their arrival in the 16th century. However, historians suggest that the Mangyans may have been the first Filipinos to trade with the Chinese. Examples of this relationship are seen in the burial caves, as porcelains and other potteries abound. However, not much ethnographic research has been made except for the tribal and linguistic differences that may lead to the indication that the tribes can be treated separately.

Culture and practices

Mangyans lived in peaceful societies. Social scientists theorized that some societies become peaceful because their system of norms and values reward peaceful behavior but disapprove aggressive and impulsive behaviors. Peaceful societies are characterized by egalitarian social organization without status competition between men and without asymmetric relationship between men and women. Another theory posited that populations adapt, therefore, offering a more logical explanation why Mangyans preferred to retreat in the hinterlands. They accept peaceful submissiveness when they encounter lowland settlers, missionaries, traders and government officials.

Mangyan are mainly subsistence agriculturalists, planting a variety of sweet potato, upland (dry cultivation) rice, and taro. They also trap small animals and wild pig. Many who live in close contact with lowland Filipinos sell cash crops such as bananas and ginger.

They called the lowlanders or the people who lives in local suburbs and plains "Damuong".

Their traditional religious world view is primarily animistic; around 10% have embraced Christianity, both Roman Catholicism and Evangelical Protestantism (The New Testaments have been published in six of the Mangyan languages).

Storytelling 
The Mangyans spread their stories through oral tradition. A select group of stories were preserved in poems and written in syllabic Indic writing. These poems were carved into materials like bamboo with a sharp object. Practicing oral tradition came with its own set of rules for the Mangyans. For example, folk-tales called suyot were only to be told after the sun had set. The Mangyans believed telling stories during daylight would lead to rotting of the teeth.

There were several distinct types of oral works that the Mangyans practiced. There are not English equivalents for every name the Mangyans gave to their story categories. English speakers have given descriptive names for these categories.

 Song poems – Contain the taboos, beliefs, and customs of the Mangyan people. These stories were used to describe the origin of customs and the importance of practicing those customs.
 Folk beliefs and customs – These stories contain the taboos, beliefs, and customs of the Mangyan people. These stories were used to describe the origin of customs and the importance of practicing those customs.
 Riddles – These stories were used for entertainment. They were mindgames and comical stories told during night hours to pass the time.
 Folk tales – There were three different types of folk tales told among the Mangyan people. Suyot is the oldest of the oral traditions. They were tales of legend, folklore, and fables. Sugklanon was another type of story, acquired through Bisayan influences. Tultulanon were stories of historical events.

The Mangyans also told stories about their day to day life to describe the world around them. There were stories about different medicines they used, and stories used to describe the varieties and characteristics of rice they cultivated. Most of our understanding of Mangyan culture and practices is derived from these oral and written accounts.

Indigenous Mangyan religion
The Mangyan have a complex spiritual belief system which includes the following deities:
Mahal na Makaako – The Supreme Being who gave life to all human beings merely by gazing at them.
Binayi – Owner of a garden where all spirits rest.
Binayo – Is a sacred female spirit, caretaker of the rice spirits or the kalag paray. She is married to the spirit Bulungabon. The kalag paray must be appeased, to ensure a bountiful harvest. It is for this reason that specific rituals are conducted in every phase of rice cultivation. Some of these rituals include the panudlak, the rite of the first planting; the rite of rice planting itself; and the rites of harvesting which consist of the magbugkos or binding rice stalks, and the pamag-uhan, which follows the harvest.
Bulungabon – The spirit aided by 12 fierce dogs. Erring souls are chased by these dogs and eventually drowned in a cauldron of boiling water. He is Binayo's husband.

Artifacts
The indigenous Mangyans offer a myriad of culturally rich artifacts that give insight into their culture and trade. The people living in Southern Mindoro during the pre-Hispanic era are exceptional in their weaving, pottery, and system of writing. Their clothing differs between genders. The male generally wears loincloths as covering for the lower body whereas the female would wear a skirt and a shirt for the top. The terms and materials would differ from tribe to tribe, but the exceptional designs would come from the Hanunó'os. Their textiles are dyed in indigo blue and has an embroidery design called pakudos at the back and can also be found on their woven bags.

Their system of writing, called Surat Mangyan, is a pre-Hispanic syllabic system and is believed to be of Indic origin. It is still practiced today and is still being taught in different Mangyan schools of Oriental Mindoro. The Hanunó'os also practice their own traditional poetry called the Ambahan, a rhythmic poetic expression with a meter of seven syllables presented through recitation and chanting or inscribed on bamboo.

References

External links
Mangyan Heritage Center
The legend of the White Mangyans – Olandes
iWitness: Ang Alamat ng Puting Mangyan – 29 January 2008 (in Filipino)

Indigenous peoples of the Philippines
Ethnic groups in Mindoro